The Duke Ellington Songbook, Vol. 1 is an album of Duke Ellington standards performed by Sarah Vaughan. It was recorded in 1979 and released on the Pablo label.

Track listing 
 "In a Sentimental Mood" (Duke Ellington, Manny Kurtz, Irving Mills — 4:22
 "I'm Just a Lucky So-and-So" (Mack David, Ellington) — 4:29
 "(In My) Solitude" (Eddie DeLange, Ellington, Mills) — 4:25
 "I Let a Song Go Out of My Heart" (Ellington, Mills, Henry Nemo, John Redmond) — 3:34
 "I Didn't Know About You" (Ellington, Bob Russell — 4:10
 "All Too Soon" (Ellington, Carl Sigman) — 3:48
 "Lush Life" (Billy Strayhorn) — 4:30
 "In a Mellow Tone" (Ellington, Milt Gabler) — 3:20
 "Sophisticated Lady" (Ellington, Mills, Mitchell Parish) — 4:05
 "Day Dream" (Ellington, John Latouche, Strayhorn) — 5:04

Personnel
Sarah Vaughan – vocals
Billy Byers – horn, vibraphone
Frank Foster – tenor saxophone
J. J. Johnson – trombone
Joe Pass – guitar
Bucky Pizzarelli – guitar
Waymon Reed – trumpet, flugelhorn
Jimmy Rowles – piano
Andy Simpkins – bass
Zoot Sims – tenor saxophone
Grady Tate – drums
Frank Wess – flute, tenor saxophone
Mike Wofford – piano

References

Pablo Records albums
Sarah Vaughan albums
1979 albums
Albums produced by Norman Granz
Duke Ellington tribute albums